Harburn is a surname. Notable people with the surname include:

 Bill Harburn (1923–1970), British footballer 
 Colin Harburn (1938–2022), Australian cricketer
 Peter Harburn (1931–2010), British footballer

See also
 Harburn, West Lothian